The 1894 USC Methodists football team was an American football team that represented the University of Southern California during the 1894 college football season.  The team competed as an independent without a head coach, compiling a 1–0 record.

Schedule

References

USC
USC Trojans football seasons
College football undefeated seasons
USC Methodists football
USC Methodists football